Jack Lees (1884 – 11 August 1940) was a British Labour Party politician who served as Member of Parliament (MP) for Belper in Derbyshire from 1929 to 1931.

Born in West Rainton in County Durham, Lees became a coal miner and joined the Northumberland Miners' Association, eventually becoming a full-time union official.

He contested Belper unsuccessfully at the 1924 general election, losing by over 4,000 votes to the sitting Conservative Party MP Herbert Wragg. At the 1929 election he took the seat with a majority of 2,955, but at the 1931 general election Wragg retook the seat with a majority of nearly 8,000.  He stood again at Belper in the 1935 general election but was again defeated. Lees did not stand for Parliament again.

References

External links 
 

1884 births
1940 deaths
Independent Labour Party National Administrative Committee members
Labour Party (UK) MPs for English constituencies
People from County Durham (district)
UK MPs 1929–1931